Hypocrita confluens is a moth of the family Erebidae. It was described by Arthur Gardiner Butler in 1872. It is found in Brazil and Bolivia.

References

 Arctiidae genus list at Butterflies and Moths of the World of the Natural History Museum

Hypocrita
Moths described in 1872